is a railway station in the city of Kiyosu, Aichi Prefecture,  Japan, operated by Meitetsu.

Lines

Station layout
The station has two opposed side platforms which are not connected within the station. The station has automated ticket machines, Manaca automated turnstiles and is staffed.

Platforms

Adjacent stations

Station history
Marunouchi Station was opened on September 22, 1914 as a station on the privately held Nagoya Electric Railway.  The station was closed on June 10, 1944, but was reopened on August 3, 1948. The station became an unattended station from October 1971.

Passenger statistics
In fiscal 2013, the station was used by an average of 854 passengers daily.

Surrounding area
 former Minoji road

See also
 List of Railway Stations in Japan

References

External links

 Official web page 

Railway stations in Japan opened in 1914
Railway stations in Aichi Prefecture
Stations of Nagoya Railroad
Kiyosu, Aichi